50 Persei is a star in the constellation Perseus. Its apparent magnitude is 5.52, which is bright enough to be seen with the naked eye. Located around  distant, it is a White main-sequence star of spectral type F7V, a star that is currently fusing its core hydrogen. In 1998 the star was named a candidate Gamma Doradus variable with a period of 3.05 days, which would means it displays variations in luminosity due to non-radial pulsations in the photosphere. Subsequently, it was classified as a RS Canum Venaticorum and BY Draconis variable by an automated program.

This is probably a binary system with an unseen companion. It is physically associated with the likely binary system HIP 19255, with the two pairs orbiting each other over a time scale of around a million years.

50 Persei is emitting an infrared excess at a wavelength of 70 μm, suggesting the presence of a circumstellar debris disk.

References

Perseus (constellation)
Persei, 50
F-type main-sequence stars
Persei, V582
RS Canum Venaticorum variables
019335
1278
025998
9145
BY Draconis variables
BD+37 0882